Charles Richard Box  (1866–1951) was an English physician, surgeon, and anatomist.

Biography
After education at Dulwich College, Charles Box started work in business in the City  of London but soon abandoned his business career to study medicine at St Thomas’ Hospital. There he graduated BSc (Lond.) in 1889, MB BS in 1892, and MD in 1893. He qualified MRCS, LRCP in 1891 and MRCP in 1897. At St Thomas' Hospital he was appointed medical registrar in 1894, resident assistant physician in 1897, assistant physician in 1900, and full physician in 1915, retiring as consultant physician in 1926. There he was demonstrator in morbid anatomy from 1894 to 1919 and during those years performed most of the autopsies. At St Thomas' Hospital he was for many years a demonstrator of morbid anatomy and performed most of the autopsies. At St Thomas' Medical School he held successively appointments as lecturer in medicine and applied anatomy, medical tutor, and sub-dean.

Box was elected FRCP in 1906. During WWI he served as a major assigned to the 5th London General Hospital. After his retirement in 1926 from St Thomas' Hospital he continued as physician to the London Fever Hospital and the Royal Masonic Hospital. He delivered the Lumleian Lectures in 1933 on Complications of the Specific Fevers. 

In 1905 in St George Hanover Square, London, he married Marian Jane Thyer. Upon his death in 1951 he was survived by his widow. His will left £1,000 to the Society of Apothecaries and gave to St Thomas' Hospital his residuary estate to form the Box fund for helping medical students.

Selected publications

Articles

Books
with W. McAdam Eccles:

References

1866 births
1951 deaths
19th-century English medical doctors
20th-century English medical doctors
People educated at Dulwich College
Physicians of St Thomas' Hospital
Fellows of the Royal College of Physicians
Fellows of the Royal College of Surgeons
Royal Army Medical Corps officers